Cauquenes Province is one of four provinces of the central Chilean region of Maule (VII). The provincial capital is the city of Cauquenes.

Geography and demography
Of these, 38,660 (67.7%) lived in urban areas and 18,428 (32.3%) in rural areas. Between the 1992 and 2002 censuses, the population grew by 3.3% (1,846 persons).

Administration
As a province, Cachapoal is a second-level administrative division of Chile, governed by a provincial governor who is appointed by the president.

Communes
The province is composed of three communes, each governed by a municipality consisting of an alcalde and municipal council: Cauquenes, Chanco and Pelluhue.

References

Provinces of Maule Region
Provinces of Chile